Acrosticta is a genus of picture-winged flies in the family Ulidiidae. An unknown member of this genus was the only successful pollinator of Acianthera aphthosa.

Species
Acrosticta apicalis
Acrosticta bicolor
Acrosticta compta
Acrosticta dichroa
Acrosticta fiebrigi
Acrosticta foveolata
Acrosticta fulvipes
Acrosticta mexicana
Acrosticta profunda
Acrosticta rubida
Acrosticta ruficauda
Acrosticta rufiventris
Acrosticta scrobiculata
Acrosticta tepocae
Acrosticta wytsmani

References

 
Tephritoidea genera